William of Rubruck (1253)
 Giovanni di Monte Corvino O.F.M. (1294)
 Arnold of Cologne (1303)
 Andrew of Perugia (1307)
 Odoric of Pordenone O.F.M. (1322)
 St. Francis Xavier S.J. (1552)
 Michele Ruggieri S.J. (1579)
 Matteo Ricci S.J. (1582)
 Alessandro Valignano S.J. (1570s–1580s)
 Andrius Rudamina S.J. (1620-1630s) - Lithuanian Jesuit missionary
 Johann Adam Schall von Bell S.J. (1592–1666) - German Jesuit missionary and astronomer
 Wenceslas Pantaleon Kirwitzer S.J. (1618–1620)
 Alexandre de Rhodes S.J. (1630)
 Francis Ferdinand de Capillas O.P. (1642–48)
 Martino Martini S.J. (1640–1661)
 Thomas Pereira S.J. (1645–1708)
 Ferdinand Verbiest S.J. (1659)
 Caspar Castner S.J. (1696–1709)
 Giuseppe Castiglione S.J. (1715)
 Matteo Ripa (16??–17??)
 Jean Joseph Marie Amiot S.J. (1750)
 Michel Benoist S.J. (1774–1775)
 Pierre-Marie-Alphonse Favier C.M. (served 1862–1905)
 Johann Baptist von Anzer S.V.D. (1851–1903)
 Armand David C.M. (1862–1863)
 Augustin Henninghaus S.V.D (1862–1939) 
 Theophiel Verbist C.I.C.M. (1865)
 Ephrem Giesen, Franciscan (1868-1919)
 Amandina of Schakkebroek (1889)
 Venerable Gabriele Allegra O.F.M. (1931)
 Prosper Bernard S.J. (1938)

See also

Catholic Church in China
List of Catholic missionaries
19th-century Protestant missions in China
List of Protestant missionaries in China
Christianity in China
Jesuit China missions
Religion in China

List
Catholic Church in Asia
Roman Catholic missionaries in China
China